Balakhna is a town and the administrative center of Balakhninsky District in Nizhny Novgorod Oblast, Russia, located on the right bank of the Volga River,  north of Nizhny Novgorod, the administrative center of the oblast. Population:    33,500 (1968).

It was previously known as Sol-na-Gorodtse.

Overview
It was founded in 1474 as Sol-na-Gorodtse. After the Khan of Kazan razed it to the ground in 1536, a wooden fort was constructed to protect the settlement against further Tatar incursions. For the following three centuries, Balakhna prospered as a center of saltworks and grain trade. By the Time of Troubles, it was the twelfth largest city in Russia.

Adam Olearius visited and described the town in 1636. That year several shipwrights from Holstein built the first Russian ships here, thus establishing Balakhna as a foremost center of national river shipbuilding. The people of Balakhna were also reputed for their skills in knitting and making colored tiles, which were used for decoration of the Savior Church (1668) and other local temples. Balakhna is one of the few Russian cities shown on the 1689 Amsterdam World Map (labeled Balaghna).

The northwestern part of Balakhna is known as Pravdinsk. It used to be a separate urban-type settlement before it was merged into Balakhna in 1993. The settlement was named after the Moscow Pravda newspaper, which at some point may have been the largest consumer of newsprint produced at the local paper mill.

Administrative and municipal status
Within the framework of administrative divisions, Balakhna serves as the administrative center of Balakhninsky District. As an administrative division, it is incorporated within Balakhninsky District as the town of district significance of Balakhna. As a municipal division, the town of district significance of Balakhna is incorporated within Balakhninsky Municipal District as Balakhna Urban Settlement.

Religion and culture
The oldest structure in the city (and in the whole region) is the tentlike church of St. Nicholas (1552). Of all the tentlike churches built in brick, this is the nearest approach to their wooden prototypes. Another church, dating from the 17th century, houses a municipal museum. The Nativity church (1675) represents an archaic monumental type of monastery cathedral. Nearby is a statue of Kuzma Minin, who was born in Balakhna.

Sport
It has a youth bandy team called FOK Olimpiyskiy.

References

Notes

Sources

External links
Official website of Balakhna 
Directory of organizations in Balakhna 

Cities and towns in Nizhny Novgorod Oblast
Balakhninsky District
Balakhninsky Uyezd
Populated places on the Volga
Populated places established in the 1470s
1474 establishments in Europe
15th-century establishments in Russia